Richard Clement Estick (born 15 July 1934) is a Jamaican sprinter. He competed in the men's 200 metres at the 1956 Summer Olympics. Estick finished sixth in the 1954 British Empire and Commonwealth Games 4x440 yards relay (with Keith Gardner, Les Laing, and the non-Olympian Louis Gooden). In the 1954 British Empire and Commonwealth Games 440 yards as well as in the 880 yards he was eliminated in the heats.

References

External links
 

1934 births
Living people
Athletes (track and field) at the 1956 Summer Olympics
Jamaican male sprinters
Olympic athletes of Jamaica
Athletes (track and field) at the 1954 British Empire and Commonwealth Games
Commonwealth Games competitors for Jamaica
Place of birth missing (living people)
Pan American Games silver medalists for Jamaica
Medalists at the 1955 Pan American Games
Athletes (track and field) at the 1955 Pan American Games
Pan American Games medalists in athletics (track and field)
20th-century Jamaican people
21st-century Jamaican people